The Big Eight Conference sponsored championships in 21 sports (11 men's and 10 women's) at various times during its existence from 1907 to 1996.  The conference began sponsoring women's sports in the mid-1970s under the direction of Assistant Commissioner Steven J. Hatchell.

Due to its common history with the Missouri Valley Conference, Big Eight championships from the 1907–08 through the 1927–28 academic year are also claimed by the MVC.

Membership

Baseball

The following are the MVIAA/Big Eight regular-season and post-season champions from the 1909 through the 1996 season when the Big Eight was dissolved. Starting in 1976, a post-season tournament was held in order to determine a conference champion.

Championships

†During these seasons, the Big Eight was split into two divisions.

Men's basketball

The following are the MVIAA/Big Eight regular-season conference champions from the 1907-08 through the 1995-96 season when the Big Eight was dissolved.

Regular season championships

†During these seasons, a playoff was held to determine the conference regular season champion.

Holiday tournament champions

From the 1946-47 through the 1978-79 season, the Big Eight hosted a mid-season holiday tournament in which all of the league teams participated. From the 1946-47 through the 1957-58 season when the conference had fewer than eight members, non-member schools would be invited in order to field an 8-team tournament. Among teams invited from outside the conference, only SMU during the 1946-47 season ever won the tournament.

†SMU was non-member of the conference invited to the Holiday Tournament.

Post-season tournament champions

Starting during the 1976-77 season, the conference held a post-season tournament in order to determine the conference bid to the NCAA tournament. All Big Eight men's basketball post-season tournaments were held at Kemper Arena in Kansas City, MO. However, from the 1976-77 to 1984-85 season, quarterfinal rounds were played on the home courts of the top four seeds in the tournament.

Women's basketball

The following are the MVIAA/Big Eight regular-season and post-season champions from the 1975-76 through the 199596 season when the Big Eight was dissolved. The conference sponsored a mid-season tournament from the 1975–1976 season through the 1981–1982 season, before switching to a post-season tournament in 1983.

Championships

Men's cross country

The following are the MVIAA/Big Eight regular-season conference champions from the 1911 through the 1995 season when the Big Eight was dissolved.

Championships

Women's cross country

The following are the MVIAA/Big Eight regular-season conference champions from the 1975 through the 1995 season when the Big Eight was dissolved.

Championships

†Denotes an AIAW title, the predecessor to the NCAA for women's athletics.

Football

The following are the MVIAA/Big Eight regular-season conference champions from the 1907 through the 1995 season when the Big Eight was dissolved.

Championships

 † Kansas would have won the 1960 title, but after found to be using an ineligible player they were forced to forfeit their victories over Missouri and Colorado, which meant that Missouri was awarded the 1960 Big Eight title.

 ‡ Oklahoma initially won the 1972 title, but after it was found that they used ineligible players, they were penalized by the NCAA, though they did not force OU to forfeit games. The Big Eight asked them to forfeit three games and awarded the title to Nebraska, but Oklahoma still claims these wins and this title.

Men's golf

The following are the MVIAA/Big Eight post-season conference champions from the 1921 through the 1996 season when the Big Eight was dissolved. In 1926 golf was dropped as a sponsored sport by the MVIAA and it wasn't picked up again until the 1935 season.

Championships

†Golf dropped as a sponsored sport by the conference.
‡No conference meet held due to WWII.

Women's golf

The following are the MVIAA/Big Eight post-season conference champions from the 1976 through the 1996 season when the Big Eight was dissolved.

Championships

Men's gymnastics

The following are the MVIAA/Big Eight post-season conference champions from the 1964 through the 1994 season. After Iowa State dropped men's gymnastics in 1994 the league was left with only two schools sponsoring the sport, as a result the league no longer sanctioned future championships.

Championships

Women's gymnastics

The following are the MVIAA/Big Eight post-season conference champions from the 1975 through the 1996 season when the Big Eight was dissolved.

Championships

Softball

The following are the MVIAA/Big Eight regular-season conference champions from the 1976 through the 1995 season when the Big Eight was dissolved.

Championships

Men's swimming & diving

The following are the MVIAA/Big Eight post-season conference champions from the 1924 through the 1996 season when the Big Eight was dissolved.

Championships

†Oklahoma was forced to forfeit the 1954 title for using an ineligible athlete, thus the title was awarded to Iowa State.

Women's swimming & diving

The following are the MVIAA/Big Eight post-season conference champions from the 1974 through the 1996 season when the Big Eight was dissolved.

Championships

Men's tennis

The following are the MVIAA/Big Eight post-season conference champions from the 1912 through the 1996 season when the Big Eight was dissolved.

Championships

Women's tennis

The following are the MVIAA/Big Eight post-season conference champions from the 1975 through the 1996 season when the Big Eight was dissolved.

Championships

†Denotes that no postseason meet took place and the champion was decided by regular-season results.

Men's track & field

The following are the MVIAA/Big Eight post-season champions from the 1908 through the 1996 season when the Big Eight was dissolved. Between the 1909 and 1924 seasons, the conference invited non-member schools to participate in the outdoor meets.

Championships

†Denotes school was not a member of the conference but would later join.
‡Kansas was forced to forfeit the 1977 title for using an ineligible athlete, thus the title was awarded to Oklahoma.
¥Kansas was forced to forfeit the 1978 indoor title for using an ineligible athlete, thus the title was awarded to Nebraska.

Women's track & field

The following are the MVIAA/Big Eight post-season conference champions from the 1974 through the 1996 season when the Big Eight was dissolved.

Championships

Volleyball

The following are the MVIAA/Big Eight regular-season and post-season conference champions from the 1976 through the 1995 season when the Big Eight was dissolved.

Championships

Wrestling

The following are the MVIAA/Big Eight post-season conference champions from the 1924 through the 1996 season when the Big Eight was dissolved.

Championships

†Oklahoma State did not accept the trophy in 1992 in order to lessen any consequences stemming from an NCAA investigation of improper payments made to its student athletes.

References

Big Eight Conference
Big Eight